Low-density polyethylene (LDPE) is a thermoplastic made from the monomer ethylene. It was the first grade of polyethylene, produced in 1933 by Imperial Chemical Industries (ICI) using a high pressure process via free radical polymerization. Its manufacture employs the same method today. The EPA estimates 5.7% of LDPE (resin identification code 4) is recycled in the United States. Despite competition from more modern polymers, LDPE continues to be an important plastic grade. In 2013 the worldwide LDPE market reached a volume of about US$33 billion.

Despite its designation with the recycling symbol, it cannot be as commonly recycled as  No. 1 (polyethylene terephthalate) or 2 plastics (high-density polyethylene).

Properties
LDPE is defined by a density range of 917–930 kg/m3. At room temperature it is not reactive, except to strong oxidizers; some solvents cause it to swell. Made in translucent and opaque variations, it is quite flexible and tough.

LDPE has more branching (on about 2% of the carbon atoms) than HDPE, so its intermolecular forces (instantaneous-dipole induced-dipole attraction) are weaker, its tensile strength is lower, and its resilience is higher. The side branches mean that its molecules are less tightly packed and less crystalline, and therefore its density is lower.

When exposed to consistent sunlight, the plastic produces significant amounts of two greenhouse gases: methane and ethylene. Because of its lower density (high branching), it breaks down more easily than other plastics; as this happens, the surface area increases. Production of these trace gases from virgin plastics increases with surface area and with time, so that LDPE emits greenhouse gases at a more unsustainable rate than other plastics. In a test at the end of 212 days' incubation, emissions recorded were 5.8 nmol g-1 d-1 of methane, 14.5 nmol g-1 d-1 of ethylene, 3.9 nmol g-1 d-1 of ethane, and 9.7 nmol g-1 d-1 of propylene. When incubated in air, LDPE emits methane and ethylene at rates about 2 times and about 76 times, respectively, more than in water.

The standard method to test plastic density is  ISO 1183 part 2 (gradient columns), alternatively ISO 1183 part 1 (MVS2PRO density analyzer).

Chemical resistance
 Excellent resistance (no attack/no chemical reaction) to dilute and concentrated acids, alcohols, bases, and esters
 Good resistance (minor attack/very low chemical reactivity) to aldehydes, ketones, and vegetable oils
 Limited resistance (moderate attack/significant chemical reaction, suitable for short-term use only) to aliphatic and aromatic hydrocarbons, mineral oils, and oxidizing agents
 Poor resistance, and not recommended for use with halogenated hydrocarbons.

Applications

Polyolefins (LDPE, HDPE, PP) are a major type of thermoplastic. LDPE is widely used for manufacturing various containers, dispensing bottles, wash bottles, tubing, plastic parts for computer components, and various molded laboratory equipment. Its most common use is in plastic bags. Other products made from it include:

Trays and general purpose containers
Corrosion-resistant work surfaces
Parts that need to be weldable and machinable
Parts that require flexibility, for which it serves very well
Very soft and pliable parts such as snap-on lids
Six pack rings
Juice and milk cartons are made of liquid packaging board, a laminate of paperboard and LDPE (as the waterproof inner and outer layer), and often with of a layer of aluminum foil (thus becoming aseptic packaging).
Packaging for computer hardware, such as hard disk drives, screen cards, and optical disc drives 
Playground slides
Plastic wraps  
Plastic bags 
Plastic containers 
LDPE Pipes 
Housewares 
Battery cases
Automotive parts
Electrical components (PP)

See also
Linear low-density polyethylene (LLDPE)
High-density polyethylene (HDPE)
Medium-density polyethylene (MDPE)
Ultra-high-molecular-weight polyethylene (UHMWPE)
Polyethylene terephthalate (PET/PETE)
Stretch wrap
Film blowing machine

References

External links

2010_MSW_Tables_and_Figures_508.pdf. epa.gov

Polyolefins
Plastics
Packaging materials
British inventions